The Camp-Fire Club of America was organized in 1897 to bring together hunters, anglers, explorers, naturalists, artists and individuals who subscribe to the principles of adventure and fellowship in the great outdoors, and to further the interests of sports afield and wildlife conservation.  Field and Stream Magazine originated as the official newsletter of the Camp-Fire Club of America.  The organization's primary focus is upon conservation and the practice and continuation of outdoor skills.

The organization also functions as a conservation and environmental group, with a focus upon the preservation of the natural environment, habitat, forests and wildlife preservation through the Camp Fire Conservation Fund.  Camp-Fire Club was instrumental in many of the biggest environmental efforts of the 19th and 20th centuries including: launching the American Bison Society and saving the American Bison in 1905, passing the Fur Seal Preservation Act in 1909, the founding of Glacier National Park in 1910, the passing of the Plumage Bill in 1910, the passing of the Migratory Bird Treaty Act in 1918, creating the U.S. National Parks System's Operatings Standards in 1923, passing the Federal Duck Stamp Act in 1929, and helping to protect Florida's Key Deer population in the early 1950s. Camp-Fire was also instrumental in getting New York State to outlaw the indiscriminate use of DDT and other pesticides in the 1960s in New York State. Camp-Fire Club continues to support conservation through a variety of efforts nationwide and globally.

Camp-Fire Club has had some notable members including: Theodore Roosevelt, Boy Scouts of America founding members Daniel Carter Beard and Ernest Thompson Seton, founder of modern taxidermy Carl Akeley, conservation giant Gifford Pinchot, 'Buffalo Bill' Cody, George Shields, David Abercrombie, George Dupont Pratt, Ezra Fitch, Zane Grey, Charles "Buffalo" Jones, Laurance Rockefeller, Carl Rungius, James L. Clark, and Clarence Birdseye. The club has had strong membership connections and close ties with many organizations over its history including the American Museum of Natural History, the Boy Scouts of America, the Bronx Zoo, The Adirondack League Club, and the Explorers Club.

References

Further reading

External links
 
 Camp Fire Club of America (1929) National park standards as defined by the Camp Fire Club of America. Am. Forest & Forest Life (August): 476, 539.

Organizations established in 1897
Nature conservation organizations based in the United States
Hunting organizations
Organizations based in New York (state)